The Big Day is an Indian 2021 reality series created by Netflix starring Divya Singh, Daniel Bauer and Sreejan Shandilya.

Cast 
 Divya Singh
 Daniel Bauer
 Sreejan Shandilya
 Itai Reuveni
 Prerna Gupta
 Kunwar Sood
 Sanjeet Raman
 Gayeti Singh

Episodes

Season 1 (2021)

Season 2 (2021)

References

External links 
 
 

English-language television shows
Indian television series distributed by Netflix